Sams Alam (born 7 July 1991) is an Indian cricketer. He made his List A debut for Arunachal Pradesh in the 2018–19 Vijay Hazare Trophy on 28 September 2018. He made his Twenty20 debut for Arunachal Pradesh in the 2018–19 Syed Mushtaq Ali Trophy on 24 February 2019.

References

External links
 

1991 births
Living people
Indian cricketers
Arunachal Pradesh cricketers
Place of birth missing (living people)